Sin Hyok (born 3 July 1992) is a North Korean footballer who plays as a goalkeeper for Kigwancha and the North Korea national team.

Career
Sin was included in North Korea's squad for the 2019 AFC Asian Cup in the United Arab Emirates.

Career statistics

International

References

External links
 
 
 
 Sin Hyok  at WorldFootball.com
 Sin Hyok at DPRKFootball

1992 births
Living people
Sportspeople from Pyongyang
North Korean footballers
North Korea international footballers
Association football goalkeepers
2019 AFC Asian Cup players